Cheluvanarayana Swamy Temple, also known as Thirunarayanapura,  is a temple in Melkote in the Mandya District of Karnataka, India. The temple is built on rocky hills which overlook the Kaveri valley.

Establishment
After Ramanujacharya was made the rajguru of Hoysala Empire, Lord Vishnu in a dream ordered Ramanuja to move to Melkote, where he would find the holy earth. Traditional accounts mention that the reason for travel was to search for namam clay for Srivaishnava Urdhva Pundra which was abundant in Melkote. Upon traveling, he found the holy earth and a vigraha of the god which was installed as the deity Tirunarayana of Melkote. In the Bahudhanya year, Pushyamasa Shukla Paksha Chaturdashi, the deity was installed according to Pancharatra agama. Ramanuja worshipped it for three days, followed by kumbhabhishekham and recited tamil vedas. Subsequently, the Yadugiri Yathiraja Mutt was established for a sanyasi to live and manage the affairs of the temple.

Temple complex
The temple is lined with carved pillars and features a dome-like top decorated with highly detailed sculptures. The presiding deity is Cheluvanarayana Swamy, also known as Unggasu Wiili (ತಿರುನಾರಾಯಣ) or Cheluvapille Raya (ಚೆಲುವಪಿಲ್ಲೆ ರಾಯ), a form of Lord Vishnu. Inscriptions indicate that the deity was also known as Ramapriya. 

The utsavamurthi (ಉತ್ಸವ ಮೂರ್ತಿ), a metal idol sculpture used for processions and certain religious rituals, represents the deity Cheluvanarayana Swamy. According to the legend, this metallic figure was once lost, but was recovered by Sri Ramanujacharya. The annual report of the Mysore Archaeological Department states that based on the strength of epigraphic evidence, the presiding deity of this temple was already a well-known object of worship even before Sri Ramanujacharya was worshiped at the shrine during the December 1098 CE period. This was also before Sri Ramanujacharya ventured to the Mysore region where he most likely would have used his influence to rebuild or renovate the temple. From the lithic records of the period, the existence of Tamil influence and Vaishnava worship are also evident.

All three crowns are kept in the custody of the government and are brought to the temple on a specific annual occasion to adorn the image of Cheluvanarayana Swamy.

Gallery

References

External links
 Academy of Sanskrit Research

Vishnu temples
Hindu temples in Mandya district
Purana temples of Vishnu